Catharsius granulatus, is a species of dung beetle found in India, Pakistan, Sri Lanka, Afghanistan, Nepal, Sikkim, China, Taiwan, Andaman Islands, Vietnam, Laos, Cambodia, Thailand, Malaysia, and Sunda Islands.

Description
This broadly oval, very convex species has an average length of about 23 to 32 mm. Body black with some red tinged hair. Head broad, where there is a conical broad horn in male. In female, there is a very short, pointed process in head, without a horn. Clypeus closely transversely rugulose. Pronotum densely covered with fine round granules. Elytra very finely and lightly striate. Pygidium finely punctured and.metasternal shield acutely angular in front. Front tibia consists with three external teeth, whereas middle and hind tibiae are broad and crenate at the hind margin.

References 

Scarabaeinae
Insects of Sri Lanka
Insects of India
Insects described in 1875